The 1984 San Marino Grand Prix was a Formula One motor race held at Imola on 6 May 1984. It was the fourth race of the 1984 Formula One World Championship.

Report

Pre-race 
A dispute between the Toleman team and tyre suppliers Pirelli lead to Ayrton Senna missing out on Friday practice running for his first Grand Prix around Imola. On Saturday his Hart 415T engine developed a misfire leading to Senna failing to qualify, the only time this would happen in the Brazilian's F1 career.

Race 
The 60-lap race was won by Alain Prost, driving a McLaren-TAG. René Arnoux finished second in a Ferrari, while Elio de Angelis was third in a Lotus-Renault, despite running out of fuel on the last lap, and Derek Warwick finished fourth unable to unlap himself in the last lap (if he managed he would have completed more laps than de Angelis, promoting him onto the podium). Stefan Bellof finished fifth but was disqualified at the end of the season, so Thierry Boutsen and Andrea de Cesaris rounded out the points finishers, despite the second one running out of fuel in the last lap.

Classification

Qualifying

Race

Championship standings after the race

Drivers' Championship standings

Constructors' Championship standings

References

San Marino Grand Prix
San Marino Grand Prix
San Marino Grand Prix